The Downpatrick, Killough and Ardglass Railway (DKALR) was an Irish gauge railway in Ireland linking Downpatrick with Ardglass. It was built from 1890 to 1892 and absorbed into the Ulster Transport Authority in 1948. It was closed on 16 January 1950.

History

The Company was incorporated on 29 November 1890 by the Downpatrick, Killough & Ardglass Railway Act, obtained under the Light Railways (Ireland) Act 1889. It was in effect a subsidiary of the Belfast and County Down Railway who were to build and operate it.

The Belfast and County Down Railway decided that it would be built to Irish standard gauge to avoid the trans-shipment of all traffic at Downpatrick.

The cost of construction was over £60,000 (equivalent to £ in )  and freight services to Ardglass started on 25 May 1892.

The  line was funded by indirect government subsidy to help the herring fishing industry. From the passenger terminus at Ardglass, a branch ran to the quay in Ardglass to allow fishing boats to unload directly into freight wagons. Freight services from the harbour started on 31 May 1892.

From Downpatrick, the subsequent stations were Downpatrick Loop, Downpatrick Racecourse, Ballynoe, Bright Halt, Killough, Coney Island Halt and Ardglass. Passenger services started on 8 July 1892.

The line found itself under the control of the Ulster Transport Authority and was closed on 16 January 1950.

References

Sources and further reading

Closed railways in Northern Ireland
Transport in Belfast
Transport in County Down
Defunct railway companies of Ireland
Irish gauge railways